Results from Norwegian football in 1923.

Class A of local association leagues
Class A of local association leagues (kretsserier) is the predecessor of a national league competition.

Norwegian Cup

First round

|}

Second round

|}

Third round

|}

Fourth round

|}

Quarter-finals

|}

Semi-finals

|}

Final
Date: 14 October 1923.

|}

National team

Sources:

References

 
Seasons in Norwegian football
, Norwegian